Imbricaria bacillum, common name the Philippine mitre,  is a species of sea snail, a marine gastropod mollusk in the family Mitridae, the miters or miter snails.

Description
The length of the shell varies between 14 mm and 32.4 mm.

Distribution
This marine species off the Andamans, the Philippines and off Samoa.

References

External links

 Adams A. (1853 ["1851"). Description of fifty-two new species of the genus Mitra, from the Cumingian collection. Proceedings of the Zoological Society of London. 19: 132-141]
 Lamarck [J.B.M.de. (1811). Suite de la détermination des espèces de Mollusques testacés. Mitre (Mitra.). Annales du Muséum National d'Histoire Naturelle. 17: 195-222]
  Souverbie (S.M.). (1860). Descriptions d'espèces nouvelles de l'Archipel Calédonien (5è article). Journal de Conchyliologie. 8(3): 311-326, pl. 11
 Fedosov A., Puillandre N., Herrmann M., Kantor Yu., Oliverio M., Dgebuadze P., Modica M.V. & Bouchet P. (2018). The collapse of Mitra: molecular systematics and morphology of the Mitridae (Gastropoda: Neogastropoda). Zoological Journal of the Linnean Society. 183(2): 253-337

Mitridae
Gastropods described in 1811